Teka Naka Ground is a cricket ground in Hinganghat, Vidarbha, India.  The ground held a single first-class match when Vidarbha played Rajasthan in the 1982/83 Ranji Trophy, which resulted in a Rajasthan victory by 5 wickets.

References

External links
Teka Naka Ground at ESPNcricinfo
Teka Naka Ground at CricketArchive

Cricket grounds in Maharashtra
Wardha district
Sports venues in Maharashtra
1982 establishments in Maharashtra
Sports venues completed in 1982
20th-century architecture in India